The RTAF Security Force Command is a Division size unit in the Royal Thai Air Force. It has been in existence since 1937. They are based near Don Mueang International Airport. The RTAF Security Force Command is the main air force ground forces and special forces which providing light infantry for anti-hijacking capabilities, protecting air bases and high value assets, protecting international airport in insurgent areas. It also serves as the Royal Thai Air Force Special Operations Regiment (RTAF SOR) which consists of various units such as Combat Control Team (CCT), Pararescue Jumpers (PJs), Tactical Air Control Party (TACP). Ground forces in this unit use textbooks similar to those used by Royal Thai Army infantrymen, whether it is in terms of first aid, forward observer, hand and arm signals, hand-to-hand combat, jungle warfare, light and heavy weapons, living off the jungle, radio communications, raiding and reconnaissance tactics, use a map and compass, and other knowledge related to infantry. But with the fact that they are an air force ground force, they have received additional training with an emphasis on protection air base and airport in response to the mission of the agency. Therefore, they received additional training about CBRN defense, combat and patrolling in urban areas, counter-sabotage air base and airport, CQB and CQC, crowd control when chaos near air base and airport, inspection and interception techniques before entering the air base and airport, defense reconnaissance in air base and airport areas, respond to anti-hijacking capabilities, using advanced technology to against aircraft threats and support air operations, and other skills related to self-defense on the battlefield if the fire base is attacked or attacked while moving.

History
Royal Thai Air Force Security Force Command at that time it was called infantry division, established by the influence of RAF Regiment. It organized according to the official rate of the Royal Thai Air Force in 1937 so-called "military regulations on the determination of the Air Force personnel 80" used on 6 September 1937. At the Air Force rate it assigned to has the infantry division consist of commissioned officers, non-commissioned officers and private. This infantry division is up to the Commander of the Wing. The infantry division be stationed on Wing 1 to Wing 5, the first five infantry divisions were the first of its kind in the Royal Air Force that means Security Force Regiment was happened in the air force.

Organization

RTAF:Security Force Command 
Royal Thai Air Force Security Force Command consist of 3 main regiments and multiple support units. Additionally, one separated air base protection battalions and one separated anti-aircraft battalions are station in each air bases.

 RTAF: Security Force Training Center
 RTAF: Security Force Regiment, The King's Guard
 RTAF: 1st Security Force Battalion, The King's Guard
 RTAF: 2nd Security Force Battalion, The King's Guard
 RTAF: 3rd Security Force Battalion, The King's Guard
 RTAF: Security Force Battalion/WING 1
 RTAF: Security Force Battalion/WING 2
 RTAF: Security Force Battalion/WING 3
 RTAF: Security Force Battalion/WING 4
 RTAF: Security Force Battalion/WING 5
 RTAF: Security Force Battalion/WING 7
 RTAF: Security Force Battalion/WING 21
 RTAF: Security Force Battalion/WING 23
 RTAF: Security Force Battalion/WING 41
 RTAF: Security Force Battalion/WING 46
 RTAF: Security Force Battalion/WING 56
 RTAF: Security Force Battalion/Flying Training School
 RTAF: Anti - Aircraft Regiment, The King's Guard
 RTAF: 1st Anti - Aircraft Battalion, The King's Guard
 RTAF: 2nd Anti - Aircraft Battalion, The King's Guard
 RTAF: Special Operations Regiment (Commando) RTAF: 1st Special Operation Battalion (Commando)
 RTAF: 2nd Special Operation Battalion (Commando)
 RTAF: 3rd Special Operation Battalion (Commando)
 RTAF: Aerial Support Company
 RTAF: Combat Search and Rescue Center (CSAR) (Pararescuemen)
 RTAF: Music DivisionEquipment

Small arms

Land vehicles

Air-defense weapons

Radar systems

Engagements
 World War II Franco–Thai War
 Japanese invasion of Thailand
 Pacific War
 South-East Asian Theatre
 Malayan Campaign
 Burma Campaign
 Bombing of Bangkok
 Bombardment of Southeast Asia
 Cold War Korean War
 Malayan Emergency
 Laotian Civil War
 Cambodian Civil War
 Vietnam War
 Communist insurgency in Thailand
 Communist insurgency in Malaysia
 Third Indochina War
 Cambodian–Vietnamese War
 Vietnamese border raids in Thailand
 Thai–Laotian Border War
 The Hijacking of Garuda Flight GA 206 (Woyla Operation) 1981 1999 East Timorese crisis International Force East Timor
 Southern Insurgency 2003 Phnom Penh riots Operation Pochentong
 Cambodian–Thai border dispute

See also
 Special Forces of Thailand

References

Special forces of Thailand
1970s establishments in Thailand
Air force special forces units